Kyrkjedørsnuten  is a mountain in the municipalities of Hol in Buskerud and Ulvik in Hordaland, Norway.

References

External links
Kyrkjedørsnuten(norgeskart.no)

Mountains of Viken
Mountains of Vestland
Hol
Ulvik